Folake Aremu  (10 October 1960 – 5 January 2021), popularly known as Orisabunmi was a Nigerian veteran actress. She was known for her roles as a priestess, pacifist, white witch or the good witch in some of her movies. Aremu is considered one of Yoruba's most talented actresses. She was nominated for Most Searched Actress award posthumously at the 2021 NET Honours. She died on 5 January 2021 in her Ibadan residence.

Early life
Folake Aremu was a native of Olla, Kwara State, Nigeria and attended Ilu Ola Primary School and Secondary Commercial College, Eruku.

Career 
Folake Aremu was a teacher for two years and later as a secretary at Sunny Radio in Ilorin, before going into the movie industry. Jimoh Aliu also known as Aworo was the one that introduced her to theatre in the 1980s. She soon started appearing in movies produced by Aworo. She first appeared on a stage play known as Ori Ma Binu. She rose to fame from her role in Arelu as Orisabunmi (which translated literarily as gift from the gods) in 1987.

She married Jimoh Aliu six years after they met and they later divorced. She died four months after the passing of her ex-husband, Aworo on 5 January 2021.

Filmography 

 Oluwerimagboojo
 Ayanmo Eda
 Iya Alakara
 Fopomoyo
 Koto Orun
 Agbaarin
 Yanponyanrin
 Ago Kan Oru (2003)
 Lagidigba (2000)
 Arelu (1987)
 Ori Ma Binu

References

External links 

1960s births
2021 deaths
Actresses from Kwara State
Yoruba actresses
Nigerian actresses